The 2023 Lory Meagher Cup is scheduled to be the 15th staging of the Lory Meagher Cup since its establishment by the Gaelic Athletic Association in 2009.

Competition format

Cup format
The 6 teams will play each other once in the Group Stage. The top 2 teams in the group will advance to the final.

Promotion
The winner of the final will be promoted to the Nicky Rackard Cup.

Group stage

Group stage table

Knockout stage

Final

References

Lory Meagher Cup
Lory Meagher Cup
Lory Meagher Cup